Sazaman-e Saidi va Sherka (also Romanized as Sāzamān-e Saʿīdī va Sherḵā) is a village in Meyami Rural District, Meyami District, Shahrud County, Semnan Province, Iran. At the 2006 census, its population was 61, in 14 families.

References 

Populated places in Shahrud County